Lans is a town in the district of Innsbruck Land in the Austrian state of Tyrol. The village is located 8 km (15 minutes by car) south of the city of Innsbruck.

Lans is located on the old salt road and first mentioned in 1180 as "Lannes". The main attractions are the lake Lanser See, several good restaurants (Wilder Mann, Isserwirt, Walzl) and the health center Lanserhof. In summer, the golf resort Sperberegg is an additional attraction.

Population

International relations
Lans is twinned with Boutigny-sur-Essonne, France since April 23, 1961.

Villages and towns in the vicinity 
Aldrans, Ellbögen, Innsbruck, Patsch, and Sistrans

Personalities 

 Erik von Kuehnelt-Leddihn lived and died in Lans.
 Heinrich C. Berann died in Lans
 Christian Berger comes from Lans.
 Hellmut Lantschner

See also
Lanser Moor
Mühlsee

References

External links

Lans Tourist Board

Cities and towns in Innsbruck-Land District